Anthurium scherzerianum, the flamingo flower or pigtail plant, is a species of Anthurium (family Araceae) native to Costa Rica. It is naturally an epiphyte, growing on trees in the rainforest.

Its most striking feature is its orange-red curly spadix. Common pests include mealybugs, aphids, and soft scale. When growing indoors, it needs bright indirect sunlight for 10 to 12 hours a day depending on the season. If the light is not bright enough, the number of flowers (flower density) will be very less. While often grown as a houseplant, it may be grown outdoors in the US in USDA hardiness zones 11 and 12.

The leaves contain calcium oxalate crystals, making them poisonous if ingested. The sap of the leaves may also irritate skin.

References

scherzerianum
Endemic flora of Costa Rica
House plants
Plants described in 1857